The 2014 Betway Premier League Darts was a darts tournament organised by the Professional Darts Corporation; the tenth edition of the tournament. The event began at the Echo Arena in Liverpool on Thursday 6 February, and ended at The O2 Arena, London on Thursday 22 May. The tournament was shown live on Sky Sports in the UK and Ireland. The new title sponsor was Betway.

Michael van Gerwen was the defending champion and he reached the final this year, but lost 10–6 to Raymond van Barneveld who won his first Premier League title.

Players 
The competitors were announced on 1 January 2014 following the Ladbrokes World Darts Championship final, with the top four players from the PDC Order of Merit to be joined by six Wildcards. The tournament format is identical to that of 2013, whereby after nine weeks the bottom two players are relegated. All players play each other once at that point. The remaining eight will then compete against each other in the final six rounds for the play-offs places.

Andy Hamilton (world no. 11) and 2009 Premier League Champion James Wade (world no. 6) did not return from last year, Wade there by missing out for the first time in seven years.
PDC chairman Barry Hearn explained the decision was made to give Wade a rest to enable him more time to gain treatment for his health issues, but Wade released a statement the following day, describing the omission as "devastating" as he was "one of the four most consistent players in 2013". Wade also said he didn't ask to be left out and didn't decline an invitation, and that, with regards the reason given by Hearn that he could gain treatment for his bipolar disorder, "no medical professional has suggested I take a break".

Venues
Week seven saw a tournament record attendance with 11,000 fans in Leeds, which was also the only new city introduced on the circuit this year, although Glasgow had a new arena with The SSE Hydro making its debut.

Prize money
The prize-money was increased to £550,000 from £520,000 in 2013.

Results

League stage

6 February – Week 1 (Phase 1)
 Echo Arena, Liverpool

13 February – Week 2 (Phase 1)
 Bournemouth International Centre, Bournemouth

20 February – Week 3 (Phase 1)
 Odyssey Arena, Belfast

27 February – Week 4 (Phase 1)
 SSE Hydro, Glasgow

6 March – Week 5 (Phase 1)
 Westpoint Arena, Exeter

*Wes Newton was originally scheduled to play against Simon Whitlock, but was sidelined with an illness, so Robert Thornton played twice in Week 5. Newton played Whitlock on 27 March (Week 8), when Robert Thornton was given the night off.

13 March – Week 6 (Phase 1)
 Capital FM Arena, Nottingham

20 March – Week 7 (Phase 1)
 First Direct Arena, Leeds

27 March – Week 8 (Phase 1)
 The O2, Dublin

3 April – Week 9 (Phase 1)
 Motorpoint Arena, Cardiff

10 April – Week 10 (Phase 2)
 Motorpoint Arena, Sheffield

17 April – Week 11 (Phase 2)
 GE Oil & Gas Arena, Aberdeen

24 April – Week 12 (Phase 2)
 Phones 4u Arena, Manchester

1 May – Week 13 (Phase 2)
 National Indoor Arena, Birmingham

8 May – Week 14 (Phase 2)
 Metro Radio Arena, Newcastle upon Tyne

15 May – Week 15 (Phase 2)
 Brighton Centre, Brighton

Play-offs – 22 May
 The O2 Arena, London

Table and streaks

Table
After the first nine weeks, the bottom two in the table were eliminated from the competition. When players are tied on points, leg difference is used first as a tie-breaker, after that legs won against throw and then tournament average.

{| class="wikitable sortable" style="text-align:center;"
|-
! style="width:10px;" abbr="Position"|#
!width=200 |Name
! style="width:20px;" abbr="Played"|Pld
! style="width:20px;" abbr="Won"|W
! style="width:20px;" abbr="Drawn"|D
! style="width:20px;" abbr="Lost"|L
! style="width:20px;" abbr="Points|Pts
! style="width:20px;" abbr="Legs For"|LF
! style="width:20px;" abbr="Legs Against"|LA
! style="width:20px;" abbr="Leg Difference"|+/-
! style="width:20px;" abbr="Legs Won Against Throw"|LWAT
! style="width:20px;" abbr="Tons"|100+
! style="width:20px;" abbr="Ton Plus"|140+
! style="width:20px;" abbr="Maximums"|180s
! style="width:20px;" abbr="Average"|A
! style="width:20px;" abbr="High Checkout"|HC
! style="width:20px;" abbr="Checkout Percentage"|C%
|- bgcolor=#ccffcc
!1
|align=left|  || 16 || 11 || 2 || 3 ||24|| 102 || 75 || +27 || 39 || 207 || 156 || 55 || 102.00 || 164 || 40.80% 
|- bgcolor=#ccffcc
!2
|align=left|  || 16 || 7 || 6 || 3 ||20|| 98 || 82 || +16 || 32 || 240 || 122 || 46 || 97.47 || 160 || 50.52% 
|- bgcolor=#ccffcc
!3
|align=left|   || 16 || 8 || 4 || 4 ||20|| 92 || 80 || +12 || 37 || 244 || 111 || 41 || 101.36 || 144 || 38.02% 
|- bgcolor=#ccffcc 
!4
|align=left|   || 16 || 9 || 2 || 5 ||20|| 94 || 82 || +12 || 33 || 237 || 122 || 46 || 97.86 || 170 ||  43.32% 
|- bgcolor=#ffcccc
!5
|align=left|   || 16 || 6 || 5 || 5 ||17|| 95 || 86 || +9 || 34 || 263 || 137 || 37 || 97.05 || 161 || 41.48% 
|- bgcolor=#ffcccc
!6
|align=left|   || 16 || 5 || 5 || 6 ||15|| 83 || 90 || −7 || 30 || 200 || 107 || 54 || 95.34 || 130 || 38.07% 
|- bgcolor=#ffcccc
!7
|align=left|   || 16 || 3 || 4 || 9 ||10|| 83 || 101 || −18 || 31 || 218 || 140 || 64 || 96.68 || 164 || 37.73% 
|- bgcolor=#ffcccc
!8
|align=left|   || 16 || 2 || 5 || 9 ||9|| 84 || 100 || −16 || 26 || 215 || 125 || 63 || 94.86 || 137 || 35.00% 
|-bgcolor=#ffcccc
!9
|align=left|   || 9 || 2 || 2 || 5 ||6|| 39 || 54 || −15 || 15 || 129 || 48 || 25 || 93.80 || 149 || 31.71% 
|- bgcolor=#ffcccc
!10
|align=left|   || 9 || 1 || 3 || 5 ||5|| 38 || 58 || −20 || 13 || 99 || 62 || 25 || 92.97 || 170 || 43.18%

Top four qualified for the Play-offs after Week 14.
NB: LWAT = Legs Won Against Throw. 
A = Average
C% = Checkout Percentage
HC = High Checkout.

Streaks

Positions by round

References

External links
Official website

2014
Premier League Darts
Premier League Darts
Premier League Darts